Eduard Thelen (born 7 September 1946) is a former field hockey player from Germany, who was a member of the West-German team that defeated Pakistan in the final of the 1972 Summer Olympics in Munich. During his active career he played for Rot-Weiss Koeln winning the German national title three times.

References

External links
 

1946 births
Living people
German male field hockey players
Olympic field hockey players of West Germany
Field hockey players at the 1972 Summer Olympics
Olympic medalists in field hockey
Medalists at the 1972 Summer Olympics
Olympic gold medalists for West Germany
20th-century German people